The men's doubles competition at the 2006 Asian Games in Doha was held on 4 December 2006 at the Qatar Bowling Centre.

Schedule
All times are Arabia Standard Time (UTC+03:00)

Results

References 

Results at ABF Website

External links
Official Website

Men's doubles